The Film and Literature Board of Review is the appeals body for New Zealand's print and media censorship system, set up by the Films, Videos, and Publications Classification Act 1993. It reviews decisions made by the Office of Film and Literature Classification. It is administered by the Department of Internal Affairs.

References 

Censorship in New Zealand